The 2016–17 Rutgers Scarlet Knights men's basketball team represented Rutgers University–New Brunswick during the 2016–17 NCAA Division I men's basketball season. The Scarlet Knights, led by first-year head coach Steve Pikiell, played their home games at the Louis Brown Athletic Center in Piscataway, New Jersey as third-year members of the Big Ten Conference.

They finished the season 15–18, 3–15 in Big Ten play to finish in last place. As the No. 14 seed in the Big Ten tournament, they defeated Ohio State in the first round, marking their first ever Big Ten tournament win. However, they lost to Northwestern in the second round.

The Knights began the season 6–0 for the first time since 1975. On February 4, 2017, with a win at Penn State, Rutgers got its first ever road win in Big Ten play.

Previous season
The Scarlet Knights finished the 2015–16 season with a record of 7–25, 1–17 in Big Ten play to finish in last place in conference. They lost in the first round of the Big Ten tournament to Nebraska.

On March 20, 2016, the school fired head coach Eddie Jordan after three years at Rutgers. On March 19, the school hired Steve Pikiell, former head coach at Stony Brook, as head coach.

Departures

Incoming transfers

2016 recruiting class

Future recruits

2017–18 team recruits

Roster

Schedule and results

|-
!colspan=9 style=| Non-conference regular season

|-
!colspan=9 style=|<span style=>Big Ten regular season

|-
!colspan=9 style=| Big Ten Conference tournament

See also
 2016–17 Rutgers Scarlet Knights women's basketball team

References

Rutgers Scarlet Knights men's basketball seasons
Rutgers
2017 in sports in New Jersey
2016 in sports in New Jersey